Public Display of Infection is the debut album by Boston rock band Tijuana Sweetheart (formerly known as VAGIANT Boston), released on October 21, 2007.

A clean version of the song "Fuck the Kells" appears as under the title "FTK" a bonus track in the game Guitar Hero II. The song "Seven" appears as a bonus track in the game Rock Band.

Track listing
 "Cocktease" – 3:01
 "Fuck the Kells" – 3:20
 "Angel of the Morning" – 3:17
 "Knock Out" – 2:17
 "Tattooed Women" – 2:46
 "Manhattan" – 3:12
 "Seven" – 4:15
 "Ftk (Safe Edit)" – 3:11

2007 debut albums
Tijuana Sweetheart albums